IES, Ltd. was a supply chain management software company that developed software for freight forwarders, customs brokers, 3PLs, importers, exporters, NVOCCs and other intermediaries to submit entries to the U.S. Customs and Border Protection, Canada Border Services Agency and other agencies.
 
Customers included Kühne + Nagel, Crowley Maritime, FedEx.

IES was acquired by The Descartes Systems Group Inc. on June 15, 2012. Descartes is a publicly traded company, ticker symbol TSX: DSG, NASDAQ: DSGX.

Prior to the acquisition by Descartes Systems Group, the software company was originally established in October 1989 and was headquartered in Midland Park, New Jersey, United States, with offices and locations in Hong Kong, Boston and Atlanta.

IES was featured in numerous industry publications such as The Washington Post, The Journal of Commerce, American Shipper, Inbound Logistics, DC Velocity and more.

See also

 Demand chain
 Demand chain management
 Demand optimization
 Distribution
 Distribution resource planning
 Inventory control
 Liquid logistics
 Logistics
 RedPrairie
 Reverse logistics
 Supply network
 Supply chain management
 Supply chain network
 Supply chain optimization
 Supply Chain Risk Management
 Supply chain security
 Value chain
 Value network
 Vertical integration
 Warehouse management system

References

1989 establishments in Ontario
Companies based in Ontario
Supply chain software companies

pt:Cadeia de fornecimento